Progress is the second and final album by American industrial metal band Ultraspank.  This is the only album to feature former Snot drummer James "Fed" Carroll. The 2nd and 6th tracks “Crumble” and “Click” are featured in the soundtrack to the 2001 PS2 racing video game ATV Offroad Fury.

Background

Album artwork 
The album artwork used on this release is a picture of the Vacanti mouse, which had a growth of cartilage molded on its back to resemble a human ear.

Sales 
Despite anemic sales, Progress nevertheless received positive reviews from critics both at the time of its release, and today.

Track listing
 "Push" - 3:52
 "Crumble" - 3:46
 "Stuck" - 3:34
 "Feed" - 4:12
 "Smile" - 3:59
 "Click" - 4:24
 "Jackass" - 3:40
 "Crack" - 3:31
 "Invite Yourself In" - 0:16
 "Thanks" - 3:03
 "Left" - 4:15
 "Where" - 10:40
 "Maybe Tomorrow" - hidden track that begins at 7:30 after "Where".

Personnel
Pete Murray - vocals, programming
Dan Ogden - bass guitar
James "Fed" Carroll - drums
Jerry Oliviera - guitar
Neil Godfrey - guitar
Peter Collins - production, mixing, mastering

References

2000 albums
Ultraspank albums